The 1960–61 Boston Celtics season was the 15th season for the franchise in the National Basketball Association (NBA). The Celtics finished the season by winning their fourth NBA Championship.

Draft picks 

This table only displays picks through the second round.

Roster

Regular season

Season standings

Record vs. opponents

Game log

Playoffs 

|- align="center" bgcolor="#ccffcc"
| 1
| March 19
| Syracuse
| W 128–115
| Frank Ramsey (25)
| —
| Bob Cousy (9)
| Boston Garden7,728
| 1–0
|- align="center" bgcolor="#ffcccc"
| 2
| March 21
| @ Syracuse
| L 98–115
| Bill Russell (17)
| —
| Bill Russell (5)
| Onondaga War Memorial6,657
| 1–1
|- align="center" bgcolor="#ccffcc"
| 3
| March 23
| Syracuse
| W 133–110
| Bill Sharman (30)
| Bill Russell (39)
| Bob Cousy (12)
| Boston Garden11,754
| 2–1
|- align="center" bgcolor="#ccffcc"
| 4
| March 25
| @ Syracuse
| W 120–107
| Tom Heinsohn (22)
| —
| Bob Cousy (9)
| Onondaga War Memorial
| 3–1
|- align="center" bgcolor="#ccffcc"
| 5
| March 26
| Syracuse
| W 123–101
| Bill Sharman (27)
| Bill Russell (33)
|  Frank Ramsey (6)
| Boston Garden12,292
| 4–1
|-

|- align="center" bgcolor="#ccffcc"
| 1
| April 2
| St. Louis
| W 129–95
| Tom Heinsohn (26)
| Bill Russell (31)
| Bob Cousy (7)
| Boston Garden11,531
| 1–0
|- align="center" bgcolor="#ccffcc"
| 2
| April 5
| St. Louis
| W 116–108
| Bob Cousy (26)
| Bill Russell (28)
| Bob Cousy (14)
| Boston Garden13,909
| 2–0
|- align="center" bgcolor="#ffcccc"
| 3
| April 8
| @ St. Louis
| L 120–124
| Russell, Heinsohn (24)
| Bill Russell (23)
| Bill Russell (9)
| Kiel Auditorium8,468
| 2–1
|- align="center" bgcolor="#ccffcc"
| 4
| April 9
| @ St. Louis
| W 119–104
| Cousy, Sanders (22)
| Bill Russell (24)
| Bob Cousy (12)
| Kiel Auditorium10,442
| 3–1
|- align="center" bgcolor="#ccffcc"
| 5
| April 11
| St. Louis
| W 121–112
| Bill Russell (30)
| Bill Russell (18)
| Bob Cousy (12)
| Boston Garden13,909
| 4–1
|-

Awards and honors 
 Bill Russell, NBA Most Valuable Player Award
 Bob Cousy, All-NBA First Team
 Bill Russell, All-NBA Second Team
 Tom Heinsohn, All-NBA Second Team

External links 
 1960–61 Boston Celtics at LandOfBasketball.com

References 

 Celtics on Database Basketball
  Celtics on Basketball Reference

Boston Celtics seasons
NBA championship seasons
Boston Celtics
Boston Celtics
Boston Celtics
1960s in Boston